Brooke Stacey (born June 26, 1996) is a Canadian ice hockey forward, currently signed with the Montreal Force of the Premier Hockey Federation (PHF). She is Kanien’kehá:ka (commonly known by the exonym 'Mohawk') and grew up in Kahnawake, a First Nations reserve on the St. Lawrence River in southern Québec.

Playing career 
Stacey signed with Linköping HC Dam in the Swedish Women's Hockey League (SDHL) for the 2018–19 postseason, after being invited by the club's general manager, Kim Martin Hasson. She would score one goal in two regular season games, before playing in all twelve playoff games, as the club lost in the finals to Luleå HF/MSSK.

Stacey signed with the Buffalo Beauts of the National Women's Hockey League (NWHL) for the 2019–20 NWHL season. She would score in each of her first five games and recorded eight goals and eight assists in the first 14 games of the season, before announcing that she was pregnant and stepping away from hockey for the remainder of the season. She was invited to play in the 2020 NWHL All-Star Game prior to the announcement and, despite being unable to play, was able to participate as a passer in the Accuracy Shooting competition and was introduced with Team Packer at the All-Star Game. Her place in the All-Star game was filled by her best friend, Metropolitan Riveters forward Cailey Hutchison.

In December 2020, she announced that she had re-signed with the Beauts for the 2020-21 season, stating that she waned "to be a role model for new moms, showing that it is possible to compete at the highest level even after a couple of months postpartum."

International play 
Stacey represented Canada at the 2014 IIHF U18 World Championship, winning a gold medal.

Awards and honors 
 Finalist, 2021 NWHL Denna Laing Award

Personal life 
Stacey is the daughter of Tina McComber and Sean Stacey. She has two brothers, Dylan and Tye, and a younger sister, Savannah.

Outside of hockey, Stacey studied sociology at the University of Maine. She has expressed an interest in working towards a career in criminal investigation with specific interest in the area of missing and murdered Indigenous women.

In February 2020, Stacey and her partner, Dylan Smith, announced they were expecting their first child and she gave birth in the summer of 2020.

References

External links
 
 
 

1996 births
Living people
Buffalo Beauts players
Canadian Mohawk people
First Nations sportspeople
Canadian women's ice hockey forwards
Ice hockey people from Quebec
Linköping HC Dam players
Maine Black Bears women's ice hockey players
Montreal Force players
Canadian expatriate ice hockey players in Sweden
Canadian expatriate ice hockey players in the United States
Mohawks of Kahnawá:ke
First Nations sportswomen